Lamin is a Gambian and Sierra Leonean given name for men. Notable people with the name include:
Lamin Kaba Bajo (b. 1964), Gambian politician
Lamin Barrow (b. 1990), American football player from Louisiana
Lamin Charty (b. 1996), Gambian footballer
Lamin Colley (b. 1993), Gambian footballer
Lamin Conateh (b. 1981), Gambian footballer
Lamin Conteh (1976–2022), Sierra Leonean footballer
Lamin Deen (b. 1981), British bobsledder
Lamin Diallo (b. 1991), Slovenian footballer
Lamine Diarra (b. 1983), Senegalese footballer
Lamin N. Dibba (d. 2020), Gambian politician
Lamin Drammeh (b. 1978), Gambian sprinter
Lamin Khalifah Fhimah (b. 1956), Libyan airport worker in Malta
Lamin Fofana, American musician
Lamin Jallow (b. 1994), Gambian footballer
Lamin Jusu Jarka, Sierra Leonean disability rights activist
Lamin Jawneh (b. 1995), Gambian footballer
Lamin Jawo (b. 1995), Gambian footballer
Lamin Manneh, United Nations Resident Coordinator in Rwanda
Lamin Marikong (b. 1970), Gambian sprinter
Lamin Massaquoi (b. 1978), Sierra Leonean footballer
Lamin Mbergan, a.k.a. Lamix (b. 1997), Swedish rapper
Lamin Saho, Gambian musician
Lamin Saine, Gambian politician
Lamin Samateh (b. 1992), Gambian footballer
Lamin Sarjo Samateh (b. 1993), Gambian footballer
Lamin Sanneh (1942–2019), American professor of Christianity
Lamin Suma (b. 1991), Sierra Leonean footballer
Lamin Tucker (b. 1982), Sierra Leonean sprinter
Fatou Lamin Faye (b. 1954), Gambian politician
Mohamed Lamin Kamara (b. 1943), Sierra Leonean politician
Momodou Lamin Jallow, a.k.a. J Hus (b. 1995), British rapper
Momodou Lamin Jallow (soccer) (b. 1996), American footballer
Momodou Lamin Sedat Jobe (b. 1944), Gambian politician